Debra L. Jones Bazemore (born December 30, 1957) is an American politician serving as a member of the Georgia House of Representatives from the 69th district. Elected in 2016, she assumed office on January 9, 2017.

Early life and education 
Bazemore was born in Liberty, New York and earned a Bachelor of Business Administration from Strayer University in Washington, D.C.

Career 
A resident of South Fulton, Georgia, Bazemore was the chair and vice chair of South Fulton United, a non-profit organization that advocated for the incorporation of South Fulton. Bazemore later founded Concerned Parents and was the president of Old National Area Residents United. In the 2016 election for the 63rd district of the Georgia House of Representatives, Bazemore defeated Linda Pritchett in the Democratic primary and ran unopposed in the November general election. On November 10, 2020, Bazemore was elected House Minority Chief Deputy Whip by members of the Georgia House Democratic Caucus.

References 

Living people
People from Liberty, New York
Strayer University alumni
Democratic Party members of the Georgia House of Representatives
People from Fulton County, Georgia
Women state legislators in Georgia (U.S. state)
21st-century American politicians
21st-century American women politicians
1957 births